Gargela renatusalis is a moth in the family Crambidae. It was described by Francis Walker in 1859. It is found on Borneo, Java, Sri Lanka and Taiwan.

References

Crambinae
Moths described in 1859
Moths of Asia